Rothwell Urban District could refer to:

Rothwell Urban District, Northamptonshire
Rothwell Urban District, Yorkshire